André Détolle (13 December 1876 – 11 November 1962) was a French politician, who was mayor of Caen between 1925 and 1944.

See also
 List of mayors of Caen

References

1876 births
1962 deaths
Mayors of Caen
Politicians from Paris
Chevaliers of the Légion d'honneur